Bargiel or Bargieł is a surname derived from a Polish name for the Eurasian nuthatch. Notable people with the surname include:

 Andrzej Bargiel (born 1988), Polish ski mountaineer
 Grzegorz Bargiel (born 1976), Polish ski mountaineer
 Przemysław Bargiel (born 2000), Polish footballer
 Barbara Bargiel (born 1982), Polish-British Film Director
 Woldemar Bargiel (1828–1897), German composer

See also
 

Polish-language surnames